Galium × carmineum, common name carmine bedstraw, is a species of the Rubiaceae. It is apparently of hybrid origin though established in the wild, a 3-way cross between  G. anisophyllon × G. pumilum × G. rubrum. It is native to mountainous regions of France, Switzerland and Italy (Lombardia, Trentino-Alto Adige, Veneto, Emilia-Romagna, Toscana).

References

carmineum
Flora of Italy
Flora of Switzerland
Flora of France
Flora of the Alps
Plants described in 1937
Plant nothospecies